Joan Maud Littlewood (6 October 1914 – 20 September 2002) was an English theatre director who trained at the Royal Academy of Dramatic Art, and is best known for her work in developing the Theatre Workshop. She has been called "The Mother of Modern Theatre". Her production of Oh, What a Lovely War! in 1963 was one of her more influential pieces.

Littlewood and her company lived and slept in the Theatre Royal while it was restored.  Productions of The Alchemist and Richard II, the latter starring Harry H. Corbett in the title role, established the reputation of the company.

She also conceived and developed the concept of the Fun Palace in collaboration with architect Cedric Price, an experimental model of a participatory social environment that, although never realized, has become an important influence in the architecture of the 20th and 21st centuries.

Miss Littlewood, a musical written about Littlewood by Sam Kenyon, was performed by the Royal Shakespeare Company in 2018.

Early years
Littlewood was born in Stockwell, London, and was educated at La Retraite Convent School in Clapham Park. She trained as an actress at RADA, but left after an unhappy start and moved to Manchester in 1934, where she met folksinger Jimmie Miller, who later became known as Ewan MacColl. After joining his troupe, Theatre of Action, Littlewood and Miller soon were married. After a brief move to London, they returned to Manchester and set up the Theatre Union in 1936.

Career

In 1941, Littlewood was banned from broadcasting on the BBC and her personnel file was marked by an MI5 officer as she was deemed a security risk. The ban was lifted two years later, when MI5 said she had broken off her association with the Communist Party. She was under surveillance by MI5 from 1939 until the 1950s.

In 1945, after the end of World War II, Littlewood, her husband the communist folk singer Ewan MacColl, and other Theatre Union members formed Theatre Workshop and registered it while staying at Ormesby Hall. The following eight years were spent touring. Shortly afterwards, when Gerry Raffles joined the troupe, MacColl and Littlewood divorced, though they still worked together for many years and Littlewood was godmother to MacColl's two children. Littlewood and Raffles were life partners until his death in 1975.

In 1953, after an attempt to establish a permanent base in Glasgow, Theatre Workshop took up residence at the Theatre Royal in Stratford, east London, where it gained an international reputation, performing plays across Europe and in the Soviet Union. One of Littlewood's most famous productions was the British première of Bertolt Brecht's Mother Courage and Her Children (1955), which she directed and also starred in. Her production of Fings Ain't Wot They Used T'Be, a musical about the London underworld, became a hit and ran from 1959 to 1962, transferring to the West End.

The works for which she is now best remembered are probably Shelagh Delaney's A Taste of Honey (1958), which gained critical acclaim, and the satirical musical Oh, What a Lovely War! (1963), her stage adaptation of a work for radio by Charles Chilton. Both were made into films. She received a Tony Award nomination for Best Direction of a Musical for Oh, What a Lovely War!, becoming the first woman nominated for the award. Theatre Workshop also championed the work of Irish playwright Brendan Behan.

Later life

After Raffles's death in 1975, Littlewood left Theatre Workshop and stopped directing. After a time of drifting she settled in France and became the companion of Baron Philippe de Rothschild, the vintner and poet, and wrote his memoirs Milady Vine. In the mid-1980s, she commenced work on her 1994 autobiography, Joan's Book.

Littlewood died in 2002 of natural causes at the age of 87 in the London flat of Peter Rankin.

Portrayals 

Littlewood was played by Zoë Wanamaker in the 2017 BBC Television drama Babs, about the life of Barbara Windsor.

References

Further reading
 Goorney, Howard, and Ewan MacColl (1990). Agit-Prop to Theatre Workshop: Political Playscripts, 1930–50. Manchester, UK: Manchester University Press. 
Littlewood, Joan (1994) Joan's Book: Joan Littlewood's Peculiar History as She Tells it. London: Methuen Publishing Ltd 
 Littlewood, Joan (2003). Joan's Book: The Autobiography of Joan Littlewood. London: Methuen. 
 MacColl, Ewan (1990). Journeyman: An Autobiography. London: Sidgwick & Jackson. 
 Rankin, Peter (2014). Joan Littlewood: Dreams and Realities. London: Oberon Books.

External links
BBC Obituary: Theatre's defiant genius (21 September 2002)
 
 
 
History of Theatre Workshop at Stratford East
Theatre Archive Project Interview with Harry Greene
A tribute to Joan Littlewood by Jackie Fletcher
Joan Littlewood (1914–2002) (The British Theatre guide)
BBC Radio3: a personal, detailed portrayal (26 Oct. 2014)
'Behind the Seams' a 1938 BBC radio documentary, in which Joan Littlewood interviews miners at Willington Colliery, Co Durham.

1914 births
2002 deaths
Theatre people from London
Acting theorists
Alumni of RADA
English expatriates in France
English theatre directors
English communists
People from Stockwell
Women theatre directors